The Cathedral of Santa Maria of Palma (Cathedral of St. Mary of Palma), more commonly referred to as La Seu (a title also used by many other churches), is a Gothic Roman Catholic cathedral located in Palma, Mallorca, Spain.

Description
Built by the Crown of Aragón on the site of a Moorish-era mosque, the cathedral is 121 metres long, 40 metres wide and its nave is 44 metres tall. By way of comparison, the height of the central nave reaches 33m in Notre Dame de Paris, 38m in Reims, 42m in Notre-Dame d'Amiens and 48m in Saint-Pierre de Beauvais, the highest of all Gothic cathedrals.

Designed in the Catalan Gothic style but with Northern European influences, it was begun by King James I of Aragon in 1229 but only finished in 1601. It sits within the old city of Palma atop the former citadel of the Roman city, between the Royal Palace of La Almudaina and the episcopal palace. It also overlooks the Parc de la Mar and the Mediterranean Sea.

In 1901, fifty years after a restoration of the cathedral had started, Antoni Gaudí was invited to take over the project. While some of his ideas were adopted – moving the choir stalls from the middle nave to be closer to the altar, as well as a large canopy – Gaudí abandoned his work in 1914 after an argument with the contractor. The planned changes were essentially cosmetic rather than structural, and the project was cancelled soon after.

See also
 Catholic Church in Spain
 List of highest church naves

References

External links

 "Cathedral of Palma: La Seu", Video in English, 3:33 min., Mallorca TV Teleweb+ 
 Virtual 3D-tour inside a Palma Cathedral
 Photos & history of Cathedral of Palma 

 History of Palma Cathedral

Roman Catholic cathedrals in the Balearic Islands
Buildings and structures in Palma de Mallorca
Churches converted from mosques
Basilica churches in Spain
Gothic architecture in the Balearic Islands
Former mosques in Spain
Churches in the Balearic Islands
Tourist attractions in Mallorca
13th-century Roman Catholic church buildings in Spain
Roman Catholic churches completed in 1601
Bien de Interés Cultural landmarks in the Balearic Islands
Solar alignment